Pierre Emanuel "Pieter" Mbemba (born 23 July 1988) is a Belgian professional footballer who plays as a defender.

Career
Mbemba has played in Belgium, the Netherlands, Turkey, Bulgaria, Israel and Cyprus for KV Mechelen, FC Eindhoven, Sivasspor, Bucaspor, Bnei Sakhnin and Omonia.

References

1988 births
Living people
Footballers from Kinshasa
Democratic Republic of the Congo emigrants to Belgium
Belgian footballers
Association football defenders
K.V. Mechelen players
FC Eindhoven players
Sivasspor footballers
Bucaspor footballers
Akademik Sofia players
Bnei Sakhnin F.C. players
AC Omonia players
Kaposvári Rákóczi FC players
Atlético Clube de Portugal players
Akritas Chlorakas players
Anagennisi Deryneia FC players
Belgian Pro League players
Eerste Divisie players
Süper Lig players
First Professional Football League (Bulgaria) players
Israeli Premier League players
Cypriot First Division players
Cypriot Second Division players
Nemzeti Bajnokság I players
Liga Portugal 2 players
Belgian expatriate footballers
Expatriate footballers in the Netherlands
Expatriate footballers in Turkey
Expatriate footballers in Bulgaria
Expatriate footballers in Israel
Expatriate footballers in Cyprus
Expatriate footballers in Hungary
Belgian expatriate sportspeople in the Netherlands
Belgian expatriate sportspeople in Turkey
Belgian expatriate sportspeople in Bulgaria
Belgian expatriate sportspeople in Israel
Belgian expatriate sportspeople in Cyprus
Belgian expatriate sportspeople in Hungary